Serques is a commune in the Pas-de-Calais department in the Hauts-de-France region of France.

Geography
Serques lies on reclaimed marshes 5 miles (8 km) north of Saint-Omer, on the D214 road.

Population

Places of interest
 The church of St.Omer, dating from the eighteenth century.
 The remains of a windmill.

See also
Communes of the Pas-de-Calais department

References

Communes of Pas-de-Calais